The W.J. Quarles House, also known as Greenvale, is a historic residence in Long Beach, Mississippi. Constructed in 1892, the structure was added to the National Register of Historic Places in 1980, and was designated a Mississippi Landmark in 2012.

History
William James Quarles was a rural school teacher from Tennessee who settled in the Long Beach community of south Mississippi in 1884. The Quarles House was constructed in 1892 as a five-bay, wood-frame, two-story residence with clapboard outer walls.  The structure was two rooms deep and sat on a foundation of brick piers with one interior chimney. The house was the residence of W.J. Quarles until 1924.

Battered by a century of hurricanes, the Quarles House was severely damaged by Hurricane Camille in 1969. Through the latter half of the 20th century, the house was vacant and sealed. In 2003, the Quarles House was listed as one of the ten most endangered historic places in Mississippi by the Mississippi Heritage Trust.

The move was approved in 2012. Following the move, restoration of the structure was initiated to achieve historical accuracy.

Cottage

When the Quarles house was added to the National Register of Historic Places in 1980, there was a one-story, two-room, clapboard cottage located just east of the main house.  In 1884, the cottage was originally part of a one-story house where the Quarles family resided while their new 2-story home was under construction. In the 1930s, the 1-story house was torn down, leaving the cottage.

References

External links
 Find A Grave (Quarles Cemetery) Retrieved 2013-08-03.

Houses completed in 1892
Houses on the National Register of Historic Places in Mississippi
Houses in Harrison County, Mississippi
Mississippi Landmarks
National Register of Historic Places in Harrison County, Mississippi